Locura de amor (English: Craziness of Love) is a Mexican telenovela produced by Roberto Gómez Fernández for Televisa that premiered on May 1, 2000 and ended on October 6, 2000. It is a remake of Dulce Desafío in 1989.

Juan Soler and Adriana Nieto (later replaced by Irán Castillo) starred as protagonists, while Laisha Wilkins, Juan Peláez and Gabriela Platas starred as antagonists.

Cast
 
Adriana Nieto as Natalia Sandoval #1
Irán Castillo as Natalia Sandoval #2
Juan Soler as Dr. Enrique Gallardo
Laisha Wilkins as Rebeca Becerril
Juan Peláez as Santiago Sandoval
Adamari López as Carmen Ruelas
Beatriz Aguirre as Doña Esther Vda. de Sandoval
Rosa María Bianchi as Clemencia Castañón
Osvaldo Benavides as León Palacios
Alejandra Barros as Beatriz Sandoval
Mané Macedo as Ruth Quintana
Raúl Araiza as Iván Quintana
Gabriela Platas as Gisela Castillo
Francesca Guillén as Lucinda Balboa
Mariana Ávila as Dafne Hurtado
Ana Liz Rivera as Mirtha Gómez
Ulises de la Torre as Felipe Zárate
Renato Bartilotti as Mauro Rodari
Alejandro de la Madrid as Paco Ruelas
Audrey Vera as Citalli de la Fuente
Pía Aun as Brenda Tovar
Omar García Peña as Juanjo Olvera y Monfort
Yula Pozo as Doris Quintana
Mario Prudom as Alejo Quiroz Castañón
Josefina Echánove as Hortensia Valderrama
Amparo Arozamena as Doña Tomasa
Rafael Amador as Rosalío Gómez
Olivia Bucio as Irene Ruelas
Ricardo de Pascual as Manolo Palacios
Eduardo Liñán as Sergio Balboa
Luis Couturier as Hugo Castillo
Patricia Martínez as Belén Gómez
Alejandra Peniche as Vilma Lara
Pedro Weber "Chatanuga" as Faustino Cisneros
Julio Vega as Don Gaspar
Aurora Alonso as Herminia López
Ángeles Balvanera as Tita Juan
Juan Carlos Casasola as Damián
Mauricio Castillo as Salustio Marín
Carlos Curiel as Israel Ana
María de la Torre as Gabriela Cuevas
María de Souza as Vera Montes
Jacqueline García as Priscila Beltrán
Amparo Garrido as Chabela
Juan Antonio Gómez as Blas
Anabel Gutiérrez as Corina
Enrique Hidalgo as Father Javier
Mayra Loyo as Rosalía
Bibelot Mansur as Rubí
Sergio Márquez as Don Neto
Consuelo Mendiola as Shandira
Beatriz Monroy as Macrina
Raquel Morell as Paulina Hurtado
Rosa María Moreno as Magnolia
Claudia Ortega as Venus
Alex Peniche as Chema
Natalia Traven as Ana
Lupe Vázquez as Justina Suárez
Tere Vázquez as Goya
Juan Carlos Colombo as Alonso Ruelas
Georgina Becerril as Elisa Becerril
Anadela as Mariana
Andrea Soberón as Natalia Sandoval (child)
Fátima Torre as Beatriz Sandoval (child)
Carlos Torres Torrija as Israel
Pepe Olivares as Carlos Vega
Norma Reyna Brito as Eusebia Torres
Adalberto Parra as Fabrizio
Jordi Rosado as Conductor Intercolegial
Mónica Riestra as Ángeles
Adriana Barraza as Soledad Retana
Dulce María as Ximena
Manola Diez as Melissa Corcuera
Luz María Zetina as Lorena
Dominika Paleta as Pamela
Héctor Suárez Gomís as Aviation Pilot
Karla Cossío as Woman in Love with León
Alejandro Ibarra as Gerardo
Alberto Estrella
Carlos Pérez
Gustavo Rojo
Raúl Araiza

Awards

See also
 List of telenovelas

References

External links
 
 at esmas.com 

2000 telenovelas
Mexican telenovelas
2000 Mexican television series debuts
2000 Mexican television series endings
Spanish-language telenovelas
Television shows set in Mexico
Televisa telenovelas